Carsten Bresser (born 4 September 1970) is a German former cross-country mountain biker. He competed at the 2000 Summer Olympics and the 2004 Summer Olympics.

References

External links
 

1970 births
Living people
German male cyclists
Olympic cyclists of Germany
Cyclists at the 2000 Summer Olympics
Cyclists at the 2004 Summer Olympics
Sportspeople from Würzburg
German mountain bikers
Cyclists from Bavaria